Kotur is a surname. Notable people with the surname include:

Alexandra Kotur, American author and fashion journalist
Rade Kotur (born  1952), Bosnian Serb businessman and convicted criminal
Vlado Kotur (born 1958), Bosnian footballer and coach